Bruno Miguel Borges Fernandes (born 8 September 1994) is a Portuguese professional footballer who plays as an attacking midfielder for  club Manchester United and the Portugal national team. He is known for his goalscoring, playmaking, penalty taking, and work rate.

Born in Maia, Porto, Fernandes started his career at Italian Serie B side Novara but soon made a move to Serie A side Udinese in 2013, followed by Sampdoria three years later. After five years in Italy, he signed with Sporting CP in 2017, where he was named club captain. He won back-to-back Taças da Liga in 2018 and 2019, as well as the Taça de Portugal, leading to him being named in the Primeira Liga Team of the Year and Primeira Liga Player of the Year in both seasons. In 2018–19, he scored a record of 33 goals in all competitions, making him the highest-scoring Portuguese midfielder and the highest-scoring midfielder in Europe in a single season. In January 2020, Fernandes signed with Manchester United for an initial €55 million (£47 million), becoming at the time, the second-highest fee for a Portuguese player leaving the domestic league.

Fernandes is a former Portugal youth international, representing his country at under-19, under-20, under-21 and under-23 levels. He represented Portugal at the 2016 Summer Olympics. He made his senior international debut in 2017, being chosen in Portugal's squads for the 2018 FIFA World Cup, 2019 UEFA Nations League Finals, UEFA Euro 2020 and 2022 FIFA World Cup, winning the 2019 competition on home soil, while being named in the Team of the Tournament.

Early life
Born in Maia, Metropolitan Area of Porto, Fernandes supported Porto, due to his mother being a supporter of the club, and Manchester United as idolized his compatriot Cristiano Ronaldo, Paul Scholes, Ronaldinho, Zinedine Zidane and Stephen Ireland, whom he looked to emulate. During his childhood, Fernandes used to play football on the streets with his older brother Ricardo, who was also a professional football player. His father, who had emigrated to Switzerland, wanted Fernandes to move with him, but he refused, due to the standard of football in Switzerland.

Club career

Early career
Fernandes began his youth career at local club Infesta. Growing up, Fernandes was offered a youth contract at Porto's academy, but he went to local rivals Boavista, who offered him transportation to training, with his parents being unable to take him to Porto on daily basis. Fernandes played most of his youth football with Boavista, starting his career as a centre-back, before being converted to an attacking midfielder at the age of 15, following a loan to Pasteleira.

Spell in Italy
On 27 August 2012, he joined Novara in Italy. Fernandes initially struggled in his new life in Italy, after suffering from homesickness and also had problems learning Italian. After his girlfriend moved to Italy, Fernandes quickly learned the language and began settling in the country, being nicknamed the "Maradona of Novara" and the "Mini Rui Costa". After only a few weeks with the youth sides, Fernandes was promoted to the first team in Serie B, and went on to appear in slightly more than half of the league games during the 2012–13 season, helping his team to fifth place and the promotion play-offs.

In summer 2013, Serie A clubs Inter Milan and Juventus wanted to sign him, but instead, Fernandes decided to sign for Udinese in a co-ownership deal, who promised him first-team opportunities. He made his debut in Serie A on 3 November, coming on as a second-half substitute in a 0–3 home loss against Inter Milan. Fernandes scored his first league goal on 7 December 2013, in a 3–3 draw at Napoli. He scored again in the second match between the sides in a 1–1 draw.

On 16 August 2016, Fernandes moved to Sampdoria on loan with an obligation to be signed permanently. He made his league debut twelve days later, playing six minutes in a 2–1 home win over Atalanta. Fernandes scored his first goal for his new team on 26 September 2016, in a 1–2 away loss to Cagliari. He scored 5 goals in 33 Serie A appearances during the campaign, helping them to finish in tenth position.

Sporting CP

2017–2018: Primeira Liga's Player of the Year
On 27 June 2017, after returning from the UEFA European Under-21 Championship, Fernandes joined Sporting CP on a five years deal, for a reported fee of €8.5 million plus bonuses. On 6 August 2017, Fernandes made his debut for the club in a 2–0 home victory against Desportivo das Aves. He scored four goals in his first five Primeira Liga games, including a brace in a 5–0 away win against Vitória de Guimarães. Fernandes' first appearance in the UEFA Champions League group stage was on 12 September, where he put the visitors 3–0 ahead in the 43rd minute of an eventual 3–2 win at Olympiacos. He finished his first season with 16 goals across all competitions, second only to Bas Dost and provided 20 assists, being named in the Primeira Liga Team of the Year and Primeira Liga Player of the Year.

On 15 May 2018, Fernandes and several of his teammates, including coaches, were injured following an attack by around 50 Sporting supporters at the club's training ground after the team finished third in the league and missed out on Champions League qualification. Despite the events, the team agreed to play in the final of the Taça de Portugal scheduled for the following weekend, eventually losing to Desportivo das Aves. Fernandes was named the Primeira Liga Player of the Year on 6 July. Four days later he signed a new five-year contract with a €100 million release clause, having turned back on his original decision to leave the Estádio José Alvalade following the departure of club president Bruno de Carvalho, and being given an improved salary in the process.

2018–2020: Highest-scoring midfielder in Europe 
Fernandes scored his 23rd competitive goal of the 2018–19 campaign during a 3–1 home win against Portimonense on 3 March 2019, through a late penalty, surpassing António Oliveira's club record for goals by a midfielder in a season, set in 1981–82. On 5 May, he scored a hat-trick in an 8–1 away rout of Belenenses SAD, in the process becoming the highest-scoring Portuguese midfielder in a single season of all time, with 31 goals to his name. He scored his 33rd and final goal of the season on 25 May 2019, during Sporting's victory against Porto in the Taça de Portugal final. He was named Primeira Liga Player of the Year for the second successive year for his performances in the 2018–19 season.

He scored seven goals in his first 10 appearances of the 2019–20 season, including a run of scoring in six consecutive appearances. This made him the third Sporting player in the 21st century to score in six or more consecutive appearances for the club, after Mário Jardel and Bas Dost. On 28 November, he scored twice and assisted the other two goals in a 4–0 victory over PSV Eindhoven, which guaranteed Sporting qualification to the knockout stages of the UEFA Europa League.

Manchester United

2019–2020: Europa League top scorer
On 29 January 2020, English club Manchester United confirmed they had reached an agreement with Sporting for the transfer of Fernandes for a fee reportedly worth up to €80 million (£67.6 million), subject to the player passing a medical and agreeing personal terms. The transfer was officially completed the following day, for an initial fee of around €55 million (£47 million), plus up to €25 million (£21 million) in add-ons and 10% of the profits should United ever sell Fernandes. Fernandes signed a five-and-a-half-year contract.

He made his debut on 1 February, playing the full 90 minutes of a goalless draw at home to Wolverhampton Wanderers. In Manchester United's 2–0 away win over Chelsea on 17 February, he provided an assist for the second goal, a header from Harry Maguire. Fernandes came on as a late substitute for Manchester United against Club Brugge in a 1–1 draw on his European debut for the club. He scored his first goal for Manchester United against Watford on 23 February, converting from the penalty spot in an eventual 3–0 victory at Old Trafford, a match in which he also provided an assist for the third goal scored by Mason Greenwood. His first European goal for the club came in the second leg of their UEFA Europa League round of 32 tie against Club Brugge at Old Trafford, in which he scored a penalty, helping them to a 5–0 victory. On 16 March, Fernandes was voted as the Premier League Player of the Month for February. On 30 June, Fernandes scored his first brace for the club in a 3–0 win over Brighton & Hove Albion. For his performances in June, he won multiple club and Premier League awards, including Premier League Player of the Month and Goal of the Month, becoming the first player to win both awards concurrently in Premier League history. He also became the first Manchester United player to win back to back Premier League Player of the Month awards since Cristiano Ronaldo in the 2006–07 season. In September, Fernandes was named as the winner of Manchester United's Sir Matt Busby Player of the Year award, given to the club's best player from the previous season.

2020–2021: Record success and Europa League final 
On 26 September, Fernandes scored his first goal of the season against Brighton & Hove Albion in the 100th minute of a 3–2 win at the Amex Stadium; it was one of the latest goals in Premier League history, and came after referee Chris Kavanagh had blown the final whistle, before a video assistant referee awarded United a penalty which Fernandes converted. On 7 November, Fernandes scored a brace and provided an assist against Everton to secure a 3–1 away win. He was named Premier League Player of the Month for November in recognition of his four goals and one assist that month, and again in December after scoring three goals and providing four assists in that month, becoming the first player to win the award four times in a single calendar year. He scored one goal and made two assists in United's Premier League record-equalling 9–0 home win against Southampton on 2 February 2021. He finished third in terms of top goalscorers in the league with 18 goals and second among the top assist providers with 12.

In April 2021, a day after Manchester United had announced their plan to quit the UEFA Champions League to join the European Super League along with 11 other clubs, Fernandes became the first potential European Super League player to comment on this, stating his disapproval: "Dreams can't be [bought]." By the next day, Manchester United withdrew from the European Super League, which was also announced to be "suspended" that day, amid a backlash from players, managers, football institutions, politicians, fans and the media. On 29 April, he scored twice and assisted two more goals in a 6–2 home win over Roma in the first leg of the Europa League semi-finals; and provided an assist in a 3–2 defeat in the return leg, which allowed United to advance to the final 8–5 on aggregate. On 26 May, Manchester United drew 1–1 against Villarreal after extra-time, in the Europa League Final, but eventually lost on penalties, despite Fernandes netting his spot kick in the shoot-out.

2021–2022: Champions League top assist provider
On 14 August 2021, in the opening match of the Premier League season, Fernandes scored a hat-trick against Leeds United in a 5–1 win. He then scored in the team's next home game against Newcastle United with a powerful shot from 25 yards, before missing a last-minute penalty against Aston Villa two weeks later that would have salvaged a 1–1 draw. He later posted an apology for his penalty miss on Instagram. On 23 November, Fernandes provided an assist for Jadon Sancho in United's 2–0 victory away against Villarreal in the Champions League, to ensure his team qualification to the round of sixteen, becoming the first player to provide an assist in five consecutive matches of a Champions League campaign for an English club. On 2 December, Fernandes made his 100th appearance for the club, opening the scoring in United's 3–2 home win over rivals Arsenal at Old Trafford.

On 1 April 2022, Fernandes signed a new contract which will keep him at Manchester United until June 2026, with the option of a further year. On 2 May, he scored his 50th goal for Manchester United in the club's 3–0 home win over Brentford. His performances declined during the season, with Fernandes alongside his teammates struggling and under-performing and with United supporters becoming increasingly frustrated by Fernandes' complaints to referees during matches, and with the club finishing a disappointing sixth place, qualifying for the UEFA Europa League, despite Fernandes being the top assist provider in the 2021–22 UEFA Champions League with 7 assists in total.

2022–2023: Ending the trophy drought
On 1 July, Manchester United announced that they had changed Fernandes' squad number from 18 to his preferred number 8, the same number he wore during his time for Sporting CP and as a tribute to his birth date and his father, upon the departure of Juan Mata, after his contract expired. Fernandes scored his first goal of the season on 27 August 2022, volleying in the only goal in a 1–0 away win at Southampton. 

On 3 January 2023, Fernandes made his 150th appearance for the club, assisting Marcus Rashford goal in United's 3–0 home win over Bournemouth. Two weeks later, Fernandes scored and provided an assist in a 2–1 comeback win over rivals Manchester City in the Manchester Derby, helping United to extend their winning run to nine in all competitions. On 18 January, Fernandes became the Manchester United midfielder to register the second most goal contributions in the Premier League, behind Paul Scholes, after scoring in United's 1–1 draw to Crystal Palace, registering his 100th goal contribution for the club. On 26 February, Fernandes started in the 2023 EFL Cup final as Manchester United beat Newcastle United 2–0 at Wembley Stadium, winning his first trophy with the club.

International career

2012–2017: Youth level

With the Portugal under-20s, Fernandes took participated in the 2014 Toulon Tournament. In this competition, he played four out, scoring against Chile in a group stage match, helping Portugal to a third-place finish 

Fernandes represented Portugal at under-19, under-20, under-21 and under-23 levels, for a total of 28 caps. Prior to his international debut, he was named captain of the under-21 team by coach Rui Jorge. He scored four goals and provided four assist in Portugal under-21s qualification campaign, helping them to qualify for the 2017 UEFA European Under-21 Championship. In June, Fernandes took part in the 2017 UEFA European Under-21 Championship, helping Portugal to a group stage finish, and scoring a goal against Serbia in the opening match.

Fernandes represented Portugal in the 2016 Summer Olympics. He started every game, as the team reached the quarter-finals.

2017–2018: Senior and World Cup debuts 

Overlooked for selection by Portugal during his spell in Italy, Fernandes was first chosen on 28 August 2017, replacing the injured Pizzi for World Cup qualifiers against the Faroe Islands and Hungary to be played the next month, although he did not play in either match. Fernandes won his first full cap on 10 November 2017, replacing Manuel Fernandes for the last 34 minutes of the 3–0 friendly win over Saudi Arabia in Viseu. 

He was then selected by Fernando Santos for the 2018 FIFA World Cup in Russia. He scored his first goal on 7 June with a header in the last warm-up match before the tournament, a 3–0 defeat of Algeria at the Estádio da Luz. Fernandes' first World Cup game took place on 15 June 2018, when he played 66 minutes in a 3–3 group stage draw against Spain, being booked in the process. On 30 June, Portugal were eliminated following a 2–1 defeat to Uruguay in the last 16.

2019–2021: Nations League title and subsequent struggles 
Fernandes was selected for three matches in the league phase of the 2018–19 UEFA Nations League group stage, helping the hosts Portugal qualify to the inaugural Nations League Finals in June 2019. In the UEFA Nations League Finals, Fernandes played both matches as Portugal defeated the Netherlands 1–0 in Porto to win the trophy. For his performances throughout the competition, he was named in the "Team of the Tournament".

Fernandes was named in Portugal's final squad for the delayed UEFA Euro 2020 tournament, appearing in all games of the eventual round of 16-exit. Fernandes went on to be criticized for his performances during the tournament, as he struggled to replicate his club form for his country, being heavily fatigued and overshadowed by other teammates, he went to be a first-team player to a substitute, by the end of Portugal's campaign in tournament.

2022–present: 2022 FIFA World Cup 
On 29 March 2022, Fernandes scored both goals in Portugal’s 2–0 win over North Macedonia in the final of the World Cup qualification play-offs to ensure Portugal’s qualification for the 2022 tournament in Qatar.

In October, he was named in Portugal's preliminary 55-man squad for the 2022 FIFA World Cup in Qatar, being included in the final 26-man squad for the tournament. On 25 November, Fernandes provided two assists in Portugal's 3–2 group stage win against Ghana. Three days later, Fernandes scored both of Portugal's goals in a 2–0 victory over Uruguay, securing his team's qualification to the knockout stages. On 6 December, he provided an assist for Pepe, who scored Portugal's second goal in a thrashing 6–1 win in the round of 16 match against Switzerland and became the second-oldest player to ever score in the tournament. Portugal were eliminated in the quarter-finals after losing 1–0 to Morocco, who became the first CAF nation ever to reach the World Cup semi-finals.

Player profile

Style of play
An attacking midfielder, Fernandes is a direct, energetic box-to-box playmaker who is capable of both taking on defenders and setting the rhythm of play. Directness also means that Fernandes tends to take a lot of risks with the type and level of passes he attempts to complete. However, despite being prone to turnovers, he typically presses the opposition right after losing possession. Fernandes boasts a prolific goalscoring record from the midfield position. He frequently shoots from outside the penalty area and is an accurate free-kick and penalty taker. His movement off the ball is also key, with him often roaming around the attacking areas of the pitch, or dropping deep to pick up possession. As well as operating in the attacking midfielder role, he can also operate in a deeper central midfield role, or as a second striker.

Regarding his goalscoring ability, former Manchester United defender Rio Ferdinand commented that Fernandes "is player who knows how to create chances [...], who can for bit of imagination, creativity, the patience around the box, the ability to hit a ball from the edge of the box an put in the back of net, [...] manipulate and take ball". Ferdinand also praised his leadership abilities, stating "he was one of the players in the game that lead's by example". Former Manchester United coach Ole Gunnar Solskjær stated that Fernandes was a "bit of a mix between Paul Scholes and Juan Sebastián Verón". Fernandes goalscoring abilities have also drew comparisons with former Chelsea midfielder Frank Lampard, after breaking his record of being the highest-scoring midfielder in Europe in a single season.

Goal celebration
Fernandes has adopted a particular goalscoring celebrations throughout his career, after scoring a goal, he usually celebrates by covering his ears with both of his hands, as a tribute to his daughter Matilde, who covered her ears pretending not to hear him.

Sponsorship
Fernandes is sponsored by sportswear company Nike. He wears Nike Mercurial Vapor boots.

Personal life
When Fernandes moved to Italy at age 18 to join Novara, he was joined there by childhood sweetheart Ana Pinho; they married in 2015. The couple have a daughter named Matilde (born 30 January 2017) and a son named Gonçalo (born 6 September 2020). He has tattoos on both of his arms with the number 8, in which he tributes to his birth date and to his father, who was also a footballer and wore the number 8 shirt, during his playing career, the letter F symbolising his surname and the number 23 as a tribute to his debut with the Portugal national football team, when he was aged 23.

Fernandes is multilingual, apart from his native Portuguese, he is fluent in Spanish, English and Italian. He also speaks some French.

Career statistics

Club

International

Portugal score listed first, score column indicates score after each Fernandes goal

Honours
Sporting CP
Taça de Portugal: 2018–19
Taça da Liga: 2017–18, 2018–19

Manchester United
EFL Cup: 2022–23
UEFA Europa League runner-up: 2020–21

Portugal
UEFA Nations League: 2018–19

Individual
SJPF Young Player of the Month: August 2017, September 2017, October/November 2017, February 2018, April 2018
Primeira Liga Goal of the Month: August 2017, September 2017
Primeira Midfielder of the Month: August 2017, October/November 2018, December 2018, January 2019, February 2019, March 2019, April 2019, August 2019, September 2019 
Primeira Liga Player of the Month: August 2017, September 2017, April 2018, December 2018, February 2019, March 2019, April 2019
Primeira Liga Player of the Year: 2017–18, 2018–19
Primeira Liga Team of the Year: 2017–18, 2018–19
UEFA Europa League Squad of the Season: 2017–18, 2019–20, 2020–21
Sporting CP Footballer of the Year: 2018, 2019
CNID Footballer of the Year: 2019
UEFA Nations League Finals Team of the Tournament: 2019
PFA Fans' Premier League Player of the Month: February 2020, June/July 2020
PFA Team of the Year: 2020–21 Premier League
Premier League Player of the Month: February 2020, June 2020, November 2020, December 2020
Premier League Goal of the Month: June 2020, February 2021
UEFA Europa League top scorer: 2019–20 (8 goals)
Sir Matt Busby Player of the Year: 2019–20, 2020–21
Manchester United Goal of the Season: 2020–21 (vs. Everton, 6 February 2021)
FSA Men's Player of the Year Award: 2020
ESM Team of the Year: 2020–21

References

External links

Profile at the Manchester United F.C. website

1994 births
Living people
People from Maia, Portugal
Portuguese footballers
Association football midfielders
Novara F.C. players
Udinese Calcio players
U.C. Sampdoria players
Sporting CP footballers
Manchester United F.C. players
Serie B players
Serie A players
Primeira Liga players
Premier League players
Portugal youth international footballers
Portugal under-21 international footballers
Olympic footballers of Portugal
Portugal international footballers
Footballers at the 2016 Summer Olympics
2018 FIFA World Cup players
UEFA Euro 2020 players
2022 FIFA World Cup players
UEFA Nations League-winning players
Portuguese expatriate footballers
Expatriate footballers in Italy
Expatriate footballers in England
Portuguese expatriate sportspeople in Italy
Portuguese expatriate sportspeople in England
Sportspeople from Porto District